Winter Was Hard is a studio album by the Kronos Quartet. It contains compositions by Aulis Sallinen, Terry Riley, Arvo Pärt, Anton Webern, John Zorn, John Lurie, Ástor Piazzolla, Alfred Schnittke, and Samuel Barber.

Track listing

Critical reception
The album was listed at #11 in the Los Angeles Times Classical Top 25 of 1989. Brian Olewnick, in the All Music Guide to Jazz, calls it a "fairly typical early mélange type recording by Kronos, mixing in au courant contemporary fare with a downtown edge and 20th century classics."

Credits

Musicians
David Harrington – violin
John Sherba – violin
Hank Dutt – viola
Joan Jeanrenaud – cello
San Francisco Girls Chorus, Elizabeth Appling, director ("Winter Was Hard Op. 20")
Earl L. Miller – reed organ ("Winter Was Hard Op. 20")
Christian Marclay – turntables ("Forbidden Fruit")
Ohta Hiromi – voice ("Forbidden Fruit")

Production
Tracks 1–4, 6–10 recorded November 1987 at Methuen Memorial Music Hall, Methuen, Massachusetts
John Newton – Engineer
Track 1 recorded January 1988 at St. Ignatius Church, San Francisco, CA
Howard Johnston, John Newton – Engineers
Track 5 produced by John Zorn, recorded September 1987 at Russian Hill Recording, San Francisco, CA (Howard Johnston – Engineer) and at Metal Box Studio, Tokyo, Japan (Ono Seigen – Engineer); mixed September 1987 at CBS Roppongi Studio, Tokyo, Japan by Ono Seigen

See also
List of 1988 albums

References

1988 albums
Kronos Quartet albums
Albums produced by John Zorn
Nonesuch Records albums